The Classified File is a 2015 South Korean crime drama film directed by Kwak Kyung-taek based on a real-life 33-day kidnapping case in Busan in 1978. It stars Kim Yoon-seok and Yoo Hae-jin in the lead roles.

Plot
A young girl named Eun-joo has gone missing in Pusan in 1978. Without any contact from the kidnapper in the past two weeks and no further leads or clues, the police assume that she's dead. Eun-joo's desperate mother turns to renowned fortune-teller Kim Joong-san, who tells her that her daughter is still alive and that she can be saved if they enlist the help of veteran detective Gong Gil-yong. Despite his skepticism, Gil-yong accepts the case. When one of Joong-san's premonitions about the investigation comes true, Gil-yong begins to believe in his psychic abilities, and the two men team up in an unlikely partnership to find Eun-joo and bring her home.

Cast
Kim Yoon-seok as Gong Gil-yong
Yoo Hae-jin as Kim Joong-san
Song Young-chang as Eun-joo's father
Lee Jung-eun as Eun-joo's mother
Jang Young-nam as Eun-joo's aunt
Jang Myeong-gap as Chief Inspector Yoo
Jung Ho-bin as Seo Jeong-hak
Jin Sun-mi as Joong-san's wife
Nam Moon-chul as Chief of Police office
Lee Jun-hyeok as Mae Seok-hwan
Yoon Jin-ha as Driver Cheon
Kim Kwak-kyung-hee as Aunt Park
Lee Jae-yong as Fortuneteller Baek
Park Hyo-joo as Gil-yong's wife

Box office
The Classified File was released on June 18, 2015. It opened at second place in the box office, grossing  from 1.17 million admissions in its first four days. By the end of its run, it had grossed  from 2,860,786 admissions.

Awards and nominations

References

External links

2015 crime drama films
South Korean buddy films
South Korean crime drama films
Crime films based on actual events
Police detective films
2015 films
Films directed by Kwak Kyung-taek
Films about child abduction
Showbox films
Drama films based on actual events
2010s South Korean films